This is a list of shipwrecks located in the region of Oceania.

Australia

Federated States of Micronesia

Chuuk
During World War II, Chuuk Lagoon (then known as Truk) was the logistical hub of Japan's operations in the South Pacific theatre. In February 1944, in preparation for the forthcoming Battle of Eniwetok, the United States Navy launched an attack on the atoll. Over the course of two days, a series of airstrikes devastated the Japanese fleet, in an offensive codenamed Operation Hailstone. A total of 50 ships were sunk, although many key Japanese warships had been relocated the week before, and thus escaped destruction.

Palau

Yap

Indonesia

Kiribati

Marshall Islands

New Zealand

Papua New Guinea

Polynesia

Samoa

Pitcairn Islands

Tahiti

Solomon Islands

Ironbottom Sound
Ironbottom Sound is the name given to the stretch of water between Guadalcanal and Florida Island, because of the dozens of ships and planes that sank there during the Guadalcanal Campaign in 1942–43.

References

Further reading

External links
 WRECKSITE Worldwide free database of + 65,000 wrecks with history, maritime charts and GPS positions

Oceania
Shipwrecks